Vidyanagar is a town in Kasaragod district, Kasaragod taluk, situated about 4.2 kilometres away from the Kasaragod town, in the state of Kerala, India. National Highway NH 17 connects Vidyanagar to major nearest cities. Vidyanagar, is also known as Kunjumavindadi. The place has a large population of Muslims, Hindus and Christians .

Vidyanagar is known as an Educational capital of Kasaragod District, as Vidyanagar houses Government College, Kasaragod, Kannur University B.Ed. center (Located in Chala, Vidyanagar), Govt ITI (Industrial training institute), Kendriya Vidyalaya, TIHSS Naimarmoola, MES KS Abdullah School, Chinmaya Vidyalaya, MES KS Abdulla School, PTMAUPS Bedira - Chala etc..

Transport

Road

The National Highway 66(formerly NH17) enters Kerala in Kunjathur of Kasargod district, through which major towns in the district are connected to Mangalore. The highway form a backbone of the road network for the district from Talapady, covering major towns like Uppala, Kasaragod, Vidyanagar, Kanhangad, Nileshwar, Cheruvathur and Trikaripur. The NH exits the district in Kalikadavu (Pilicode) which ends at Edappally.

Air

The nearest airport to Vidyanagar is Mangalore International Airport, which is around 60 km away from the town. Kannur International Airport, which is 116 km, Other airports near Vidyanagar is Calicut International Airport, lies about 223 km to the south and Mysore Airport, which is around 259 km to the south east.

Languages 
Kasargod district is one of the rare districts in India which houses as many as 7 different languages (excluding dialects and tribal languages), with each spoken by a substantial number of people.

Climate
Vidyanagar experiences a Tropical monsoon climate under the Köppen climate classification.

Administration

Parliament Constituency
 Kasaragod

Assembly Constituencies
Kasaragod

Sports 
Cricket and football are given major importance in Vidyanagar. Other major sports like volleyball and badminton are also practiced in here.

Vidyanagar has some major stadiums like Kasaragod Municipal stadium.
Friends Chala Arts and sports club & Chandragiri Arts and Sports club are major clubs in Vidyanagar, oldest  cricket, football clubs in the district.

References

External links
 Friends Chala Arts and Sports Club

Suburbs of Kasaragod